Gonbad-e Mahuiyeh (also Romanized as Gonbad-e Māhū’īyeh) is a village in Gughar Rural District, in the Central District of Baft County, Kerman Province, Iran. At the 2006 census, its population was 21, in 8 families.

References 

Populated places in Baft County